David Butler (born 1992) is an Irish hurler who plays as a right wing-forward for the Kerry senior team.

Born in Dundrum, County Tipperary, Butler first played competitive hurling during his schooling at Cashel Community sive School. He arrived on the inter-county scene at the age of sixteen when he first linked up with the Tipperary minor team before later joining the junior Gaelic football team. He made his senior debut for Kerry during the 2014 league. Butler quickly became a regular member of the starting fifteen and has won one Christy Ring Cup medal. He has been a Christy Ring Cup runner-up on one occasion.

At club level Butler plays with Knockavilla–Donaskeigh Kickhams.

Honours

Team

Kerry
Christy Ring Cup (1): 2015

References

1992 births
Living people
Knockavilla-Donaskeigh Kickhams hurlers
Knockavilla-Donaskeigh Kickhams Gaelic footballers
Tipperary inter-county hurlers
Tipperary inter-county Gaelic footballers
Kerry inter-county hurlers